Farah Baker is a Palestinian social media activist living in the Gaza Strip, who became popular while live-Tweeting the 2014 Israel–Gaza conflict. At the age of 16, she tweeted her thoughts and feelings as bombing raids occurred at her home. Her Tweets became a social network phenomenon, and Baker's following on Twitter jumped from  800 to 166,000 in a few days. In Anna Reading's book, Gender and Memory in the Globital Age she writes that Baker was covered in news articles in The Daily Telegraph in the UK and Russia Today.

References 

Living people
Year of birth missing (living people)
1990s births
Palestinian activists
Women activists
People from the Gaza Strip